Simon Krauss (born 12 February 1992) is a French athlete specialising in the high hurdles. He won a gold medal at the 2013 European U23 Championships.

His personal bests are 13.51 seconds in the 110 metres hurdles (-0.3 m/s, Montreuil-sous-Bois 2014) and 7.63 seconds in the 60 metres hurdles (Reims 2018).

International competitions

1Disqualified in the semifinals

References

1992 births
Living people
French male hurdlers
Sportspeople from Orléans
Athletes (track and field) at the 2018 Mediterranean Games
Mediterranean Games competitors for France
20th-century French people
21st-century French people